Hadala Bhal railway station is a small railway station in Surendranagar district, Gujarat. Its code is HLB. It serves Hadala village.

Hadala Bhal railway station is part of Ahmedabad–Botad line. Currently this line is undergoing gauge conversion, from metre to broad gauge.

References 

Bhavnagar railway division
Railway stations in Surendranagar district